Cleinias of Tarentum (fl. 4th-century BCE) was a Pythagorean philosopher, and a contemporary and friend of Plato, as appears from the story (perhaps otherwise worthless) which Diogenes Laërtius gives on the authority of Aristoxenus, to the effect that Plato wished to burn all the writings of Democritus which he could collect, but was prevented by Cleinias and Amyclus of Heraclea.  In his practice, Cleinias was a true Pythagorean.  Thus, we hear that he used to assuage his anger by playing on his harp; and, when Prorus of Cyrene had lost all his fortune through a political revolution, Cleinias, who knew nothing of him except that he was a Pythagorean, took on himself the risk of a voyage to Cyrene, and supplied him with money to the full extent of his loss.

A text written by Cleinias exists among some other Pythagorean philosophers' at the end of Iamblichus' "Life of Pythagoras" in the referenced edition, where his name is spelled "Clinias".

Notes

References

4th-century BC Greek people
4th-century BC philosophers
Pythagoreans of Magna Graecia
Ancient Tarantines